

1946

Non-circulating coins

1947

Non-circulating coins

1948

Non-circulating coins

1949

Non-circulating coins

References 

Commemorative coins of the United States